Arpophyllum is a genus of flowering plants from the orchid family, Orchidaceae. It contains 3 species, native to Mexico, Belize, Central America, Colombia, Venezuela and Jamaica.

Species
As of May 2014, three species were recognized:

Arpophyllum giganteum Hartw. ex Lindl. - Veracruz, Chiapas, Oaxaca, Central America, Colombia, Venezuela, Jamaica
Arpophyllum giganteum subsp. alpinum (Lindl.) Dressler - Chiapas, El Salvador, Guatemala, Honduras
Arpophyllum giganteum subsp. giganteum - Veracruz, Chiapas, Oaxaca, Central America, Colombia, Venezuela, Jamaica
Arpophyllum giganteum subsp. medium (Rchb.f.) Dressler - Veracruz, Chiapas, Oaxaca, Central America
Arpophyllum laxiflorum Pfitzer - eastern, central and southern Mexico
Arpophyllum spicatum Lex. in P.de La Llave & J.M.de Lexarza - eastern, central and southern Mexico; south to Costa Rica

See also
 List of Orchidaceae genera

References

  (2006). Epidendroideae (Part One). Genera Orchidacearum 4: 193 ff. Oxford University Press.
 Berg Pana, H. 2005. Handbuch der Orchideen-Namen. Dictionary of Orchid Names. Dizionario dei nomi delle orchidee. Ulmer, Stuttgart

External links
 
 

Laeliinae genera
Laeliinae